NPO Klassiek is a public-service radio channel in the Netherlands, broadcasting chiefly classical music. It is part of the Netherlands Public Broadcasting system, NPO.

History

The channel began broadcasting on 28 December 1975 under the name Hilversum 4, changed to Radio 4 on 1 December 1985. Its first programme was produced by the Veronica broadcasting association (VOO).

On 19 August 2014, the station's name and logo were amended to include mention of its parent broadcasting organization, NPO. 

On 1 January 2023, the stations name changed to NPO Klassiek, a hub for all classical music of NPO with the radio at the center, but now with  all media related to classical music.

Content contributors
The following broadcasting associations and organisations currently provide programming on NPO Klassiek: AVROTROS, BNNVARA, EO, KRO-NCRV, MAX, NTR and VPRO.

Broadcasting
Initially, the channel broadcast only during the evenings, with a segment produced by Teleac, but it now operates around the clock, providing surround sound transmissions via the internet and satellite.

Programming
The emphasis during the day was once all-complete works from both well- and lesser-known tracks; however, the station now focuses more on short segments from better-known classical repertoire. In the evening (around 8-11pm), a live concert is broadcast, on Saturday evening a regular live recording of an opera concert. Since 2015, live shows can be watched in the studio via a webcam.

See also
 List of radio stations in the Netherlands

External links 
 Npoklassiek.nl

Radio stations in the Netherlands
Netherlands Public Broadcasting
Classical music radio stations
Radio stations established in 1975